The Applied Catalysis Award is awarded by the Royal Society of Chemistry to individuals for "creativity and excellence in novel approaches or use of catalysis in industry." The award was established in 2008. The winner of the award is chosen by the Industry & Technology Division Awards Committee, and receives £2000, a medal and a certificate.

Previous winners
Source: RSC

See also

 List of chemistry awards

References

Awards of the Royal Society of Chemistry
Catalysis
Awards established in 2010